Heavy Rock Radio is an album by Jørn Lande's solo project Jorn. It consists of cover songs from artists that inspired the singer to start his career in music. Jorn has previously released albums of cover songs in 2007, with the album Unlocking the Past, and in 2010, with his tribute to Ronnie James Dio on the album Dio.

This time, instead of focusing on recording more obscure rock songs from the 1970s and '80s, Jorn chose to do an album with more well known songs, including big hits such as the Eagles's "Hotel California", Journey's "Don't Stop Believin'" and Queen's "Killer Queen". Some songs in the album have Jorn showing his admiration for pop artists such as Kate Bush, Frida and John Farnham, as well as recording two songs from the 2000s, namely Iron Maiden's "The Final Frontier" and Paul Stanley's "Live to Win." He also included his typical tributes to Ronnie James Dio, with Dio's "Rainbow in the Dark" and Black Sabbath's "Die Young", and a cover of Foreigner's "Rev on the Red Line."

Track listing

Personnel

Jørn Lande - Lead & Backing Vocals, Producer
Trond Holter - Guitar, Mixing
Thomas Bekkevold - Bass
Francesco Jovino - Drums
Alessandro Del Vecchio - Keyboards

Additional musicians

 Tore Moren - guitar on "Rainbow in the Dark"
 Jimmy Iversen - guitar on "Rainbow in the Dark"
 Nic Angileri - bass on "Rainbow in the Dark"
 Lasse Jensen - keyboards on "Rainbow in the Dark"
 Willy Bendiksen - drums on "Rainbow in the Dark" and "Stormbringer"
 Jørn Viggo Lofstad - guitar on "Stormbringer"
 Sid Ringsby - bass on "Stormbringer"

References

2016 albums
Frontiers Records albums